Sripathi Panditaradhyula Sailaja is an Indian singer and actress who has sung in Tamil, Telugu, Kannada and Malayalam films.

Early life
She was born in Nellore district of Andhra Pradesh. Her father, S. P. Sambamurthy, was an exponent of Harikatha and her brother S. P. Balasubrahmanyam was a playback singer in Telugu, Tamil, Hindi, Kannada and Malayalam films. She is the youngest of the eight children of Sambamurthy and Sakunthalamma (d. 2019).

Career

Voice acting
Sailaja has occasionally worked as a voice actor and dubbed for various artistes including Tabu, Sonali Bendre and Sridevi among others. She started dubbing for the movie Seetamalakshmi heroine Rameshwari.She predominantly dubbed for actresses in Telugu films or Telugu dubbed from Tamil films.

Acting
Sailaja acted in Saagara Sangamam, a Telugu film directed by K. Viswanath, in which she played the role of a classical dancer.

Television works
Sailaja started her television career with the ETV show SaRiGaMalu which she co-hosted along with singer Mano.

Sailaja has appeared as both an audition judge and a guest judge in several reality talent hunt shows such as Vijay TV's Airtel Super Singer, Airtel Super Singer Junior, Jaya TV's Jaya Super Singer South India, Zee Telugu's SaReGaMaPa Little Champs and SaReGaMaPa.

Filmography

Actress

Playback Singer
Maarpu (1977)
Mana Voori Pandavulu (1978)
Pranam Kareedu (1978)
Manitharil Ithanai Nirangalah! (1978)
Agal Vilakku (1979)
Kalyanaraman (1979) (Tamil)
Niram Maaratha Pookkal (1979)
Ponnu Oorukku Pudhusu (1979)
Suvarilladha Chiththirangal (1979)Sankarabharanam (1979)Mosagadu (1980)Vamsa Vruksham (1980)Johnny(1980)Seethakoka Chiluka (1981)Meendum Kokila (1981)Thanikattu Raja (1982)Agaya Gangai (film) (1982)Subhalekha (1982)Gopurangal Saivathillai (1982)Sitaara (1983)Saagara Sangamam (1983)Salangai Oli (1983) (Dubbed version of Saagara Sangamam)Rendu Jella Sita (1983)Sattam (1983)Adutha Varisu (1983)Kokkarako (1983)Janani Janmabhoomi (1984)Mayuri (1984)Naan Paadum Paadal (1984)Poi Mugangal (1986)Swathi Muthyam (1985)Sippikkul Muthu (1985) (Dubbed version of Swathi Muthyam)Swathi (1985)Jackie (1985)Sur Sangam (1985)Pagal Nilavu (1985)Thazhuvatha Kaigal (1986)Sirivennela (1986)Mr. Bharath (1986)Padamati Sandhya Ragam (1986)Magadheerudu (1986)Sri Kanaka Mahalakshmi Recording Dance Troupe (1987)Swayam Krushi (1987)Rudraveena (1988)Bava Marudula Sawal (1988)Swara Kalpana (1989)Siva (1989)Apoorva Sagodharargal (1989)Raja Chinna Roja (1989)Kokila (1989)Suthradharulu (1990)Appula Appa Rao (1991)Pelli Pusthakam (1991)Sigaram (1991)Siva Shakthi (1991)Bangaru Bullodu (1993)Aagraham (1993)Subha Sankalpam (1995)Paasavalai (1995)Annamayya (1997)Aawaragaadu (2000)Mrugaraju (2001)Unnai Charanadainthaen'' (2003)

Dubbing

References

External links
 

Living people
Indian women playback singers
Indian voice actresses
Tamil playback singers
Kannada playback singers
Telugu playback singers
Nandi Award winners
Actresses in Telugu cinema
Indian film actresses
20th-century Indian actresses
1963 births
20th-century Indian singers
Singers from Andhra Pradesh
Film musicians from Andhra Pradesh
People from Nellore district
20th-century Indian women singers
Women musicians from Andhra Pradesh
21st-century Indian singers
21st-century Indian women singers